"Faith" is the third and final single released from the Lords of the Underground's second album, Keepers of the Funk. The song was produced by the Lords of the Underground themselves and featured singer, Deniece Williams, as well as sampling her 1976 song, "Free". "Faith" has thus far been the group's final charting single, peaking at 49 on the Hot Rap Singles and 31 on the Dance/Maxi-Singles chart. It was also the group's only charting single not to be produced by either Marley Marl or K-Def.

Single track listing

A-Side
"Faith" (Radio Version)- 4:02
"Faith" (Alternate Mix)- 4:24
"Faith" (Original TV track)- 4:03
"Faith" (Alternate TV Track)- 4:24

B-Side
"Neva Faded" (Clean Radio Edit)- 5:15
"Neva Faded" (Instrumental)- 5:15
"What I'm After" (Remix)- 5:09
"Faith" (Acapella)- 3:38

Charts

1995 singles
Lords of the Underground songs
1994 songs